The 2013 Molson Canadian Men's Provincial Curling Championship, the men's provincial curling championship for New Brunswick, was held from January 30 to February 3 at the Gladstone Curling Club in Fredericton Junction, New Brunswick. The winning team will represent New Brunswick at the 2013 Tim Hortons Brier in Edmonton, Alberta.

Teams
The teams are listed as follows:

Round-robin standings
Final round-robin standings

Round-robin results

Draw 1
Wednesday, January 30, 12:30 pm

Draw 2
Wednesday, January 30, 8:00 pm

Draw 3
Thursday, January 31, 12:30 pm

Draw 4
Thursday, January 31, 8:00 pm

Draw 5
Friday, February 1, 11:30 am

Draw 6
Friday, February 1, 7:00 pm

Draw 7
Saturday, February 2, 11:30 am

Playoffs

Semifinal
Saturday, February 2, 7:00 pm

Final
Sunday, February 3, 2:00 pm

Qualification events

Preliminary round
The preliminary round for the 2013 Molson Canadian Men's Provincial Curling Championship will take place from January 10 to 13 at Curl Moncton Beauséjour in Moncton. Four teams will qualify to the provincials from the preliminary round.

Teams
The teams are listed as follows:

Results

A Event

B Event

C Event

Wildcard round
The wildcard round for the 2013 Molson Canadian Men's Provincial Curling Championship will take place from January 18 to 20 at Gage Golf and Curling Club in Oromocto. Four teams will qualify to the provincials from the wildcard round.

Teams
The teams are listed as follows:

Results

A Event

B Event

C Event

References

External links

New Brunswick
Curling competitions in New Brunswick
2013 in New Brunswick